Derby Storm was a former British Basketball League (BBL) franchise from the city of Derby, Derbyshire. The team took the decision to sit out the 2002–03 season after failing to find a suitable venue for home games. Despite early efforts for a new arena, the franchise never returned to playing action.

Founded in 1984 as the Derby Turbos later changed to Derby Rams in 1985. (which NBA head coach Nick Nurse was a player/coach), the team was a founder member of the franchise-based professional BBL when it was set up in 1987. Another name change took place in 1991, becoming the Derby Bucks, and in 1993 the franchise withdrew from the BBL due to financial problems, but was "rescued" and allowed to re-enter before the new season began.

Future Toronto Raptors coach and NBA championship winner Nick Nurse coached here in 1990.

The team became known as the Derby Storm in 1995 and was the first British basketball club to own their own venue, the Thunderdome  Storm Arena, which was in fact a converted factory. The compact arena was definitely one of the most characteristic venues in the League, and often the subject of many jokes from rival fans.

Storm were given permission to "sit out" the 2002–03 season, to generate finance and find an alternative venue, but having not returned since, the franchise membership with the BBL has lapsed. Basketball remained in the city however as fans took it upon themselves to take control of Storm's reserve team and reform them as Derby Trailblazers. The Blazers adopted one of Storm's former homes, the Moorways Centre, as their home venue.

Season-by-season records

See also
 John Trezvant

Notes

Defunct basketball teams in the United Kingdom
Sport in Derby
2002 disestablishments in England
Basketball teams disestablished in 2002
1984 establishments in England
Basketball teams established in 1984
Former British Basketball League teams